This is a list of ecoregions in Nicaragua as defined by the World Wildlife Fund and the Freshwater Ecoregions of the World database.

Terrestrial ecoregions

Tropical and subtropical moist broadleaf forests
 Cayos Miskitos–San Andrés and Providencia moist forests
 Central American Atlantic moist forests
 Central American montane forests
Costa Rican seasonal moist forests
Isthmian–Atlantic moist forests

Tropical and subtropical dry broadleaf forests
 Central American dry forests

Tropical and subtropical coniferous forests
 Central American pine–oak forests
 Miskito pine forests

Mangroves
 Gulf of Fonseca mangroves
Mosquitia–Nicaraguan Caribbean Coast mangroves	
Southern Dry Pacific Coast mangroves
Rio Negro–Rio San Sun mangroves

Tropical and subtropical coastal rivers
 Chiapas–Fonseca
 Mosquitia
 Estero Real–Tempisque
 San Juan (Nicaragua/Costa Rica)

Marine ecoregions

Tropical Northwestern Atlantic
 Southwestern Caribbean

Tropical East Pacific
 Chiapas–Nicaragua

References

 
Nicaragua
Ecoregions